Moca is the capital of Espaillat province in the Cibao region of the Dominican Republic, and is the tenth-largest city of the country with a population of 173,442 inhabitants. Moca is located 11 miles/18 kilometers east from the country’s second-largest city, Santiago. It is divided into eight municipal districts: San Víctor, Las Lagunas, José Contreras, Juan López, El Higuerito, La Ortega, Monte de la Jagua and Canca La Reina.

The city is known as "La Villa Heroica" (Village of Heroes) due to the number of men and women from Moca who have played a major role in the Dominican Republic's history in bringing down two dictators, Ulises Heureaux and Rafael Trujillo, and bringing democracy back to the country.

Moca is home to the Corazon Sagrado de Jesus ("Sacred Heart of Jesus") Cathedral. All its pane glass windows were originally brought from Italy depicting the apostles and Jesus' path to the crucifixion. Agriculture forms the primary livelihood of the inhabitants.  Plantain and yucca are main crops. Most crops are harvested by hand.

Etymology

According to Emiliano Tejera, Moca means a tree that overlooks the river banks. Others claim that the word comes from the region of Mocán, a section in the province of La Vega near the river. Others claim that the word Moca is based on the coffee crop name: Mocca. According to Franklin Torres Moca is derived from an Aboriginal term which was adopted by the European settlers.

History
Moca was founded in 1780.

Economy

Moca has a very important banking sector, the city is home to branches of all commercial banks of the country. A strong business in shops, furniture, supermarkets, warehouses, factories of footwear, food, construction, and hardware.

The city has the largest coffee manufacturing industry, Industries Banilejas. The city is also known for its agricultural production, with the plantain, banana and cassava as major crops. Other fruits: bananas, pigeon pea, taro, yams, squash, beans, coffee, oranges, lemons, grapefruit, papaya (papaya), etc. A variety of vegetables such as lettuce, tomatoes, eggplants, peppers, cabbage are cultivated, among others. It also has a great development in poultry products, with a production of 70% in this sector.

Geography
Moca has a total area of 339.21 km². The municipality sits on a volcanic coral reef with hills to the west and low mountains to the north; these mountains are part of the Cordillera Septentrional. Moca is at an elevation of 183 m with an average temperature in the city of 26,5 °C in 2022 and an average rainfall of 192,55 mm in 2022.

Climate

Notable residents
Trina de Moya (1863–1943) – poet and First Lady of the Dominican Republic (1899, 1902–1903, 1924–1930)

Sports 
Estadio Bragaña Garcia, baseball stadium

References

External links
ayuntamientomoca.gob.do

Municipalities of the Dominican Republic
Populated places in Espaillat Province
Populated places established in 1780